Arrow Peak is a high mountain summit in the Grenadier Range of the Rocky Mountains of North America.

Mountain
Arrow Peak ranks 123rd among the highest mountains in Colorado and 182nd in the whole of the United States. Some of the peaks nearest to it are: Vestal Peak, Graystone Peak, Electric Peak, Point Pun, West Trinity, and Mount Garfield.

Arrow Peak falls under the Grenadier Range of San Juan Mountains. Given its rocky face, Arrow Peak, like other peaks of the Grenadier Range, offers one of the best mountaineering adventures in Colorado. History has it that the first Americans to scale Arrow Peak were William Cooper and John Hubbard in 1908, which was followed by a second ascent in 1932 by Carleton Long and John Nelson via a more arduous route called the Greystone-Arrow saddle.

Arrow Peak and its neighboring, peaks, especially Vestal Peak, all formed from the metamorphic rock quartzite, are considered hard climbs, Arrow Peak ranking as the toughest before a new route was found.

See also

List of Colorado mountain ranges
List of Colorado mountain summits
List of Colorado fourteeners
List of Colorado 4000 meter prominent summits
List of the most prominent summits of Colorado
List of Colorado county high points

References

External links

San Juan Mountains (Colorado)
Mountains of San Juan County, Colorado
North American 4000 m summits
San Juan National Forest
Mountains of Colorado